Masaika is an administrative ward in the Pangani Division of the Pangani District within the Tanga Region of Tanzania. In 2016 the Tanzania National Bureau of Statistics report there were 2,080 people in the ward.

References

Wards of Tanga Region
Pangani District
Populated places in Tanga Region